iPTF14atg is a type-Ia supernova discovered on 3 May 2015. The supernova is located in galaxy IC 831, some  distant. The supernova is thought to have ignited on May 2 or 3. The supernova's shockwave slammed into a companion star, shocking it into producing an ultraviolet pulse. The companion star that was hit is suspected to be a red giant star. This detection of the UV signal represents the first time the collision event of a supernova shockwave upon a companion star has been detected. The supernova was discovered by the Intermediate Palomar Transient Factory (iPTF), a successor to the earlier Palomar Transient Factory, and based at the Palomar Observatory in California. The data was processed by collaborators in Europe, that lead to the supernova discovery.

This single-degenerate white dwarf with normal star binary system represents one of two mechanisms for producing a type-Ia supernova, the other being double-degenerate two white dwarf binary stars.

Further reading

References

External links
 Light curves  on the Open Supernova Catalog
 Astronomy Now magazine, "Supernova observed colliding with its companion star", 20 May 2015
 Nature World News, "Rare Supernova Sheds Light on its Mysterious Origins", Jenna Iacurci, 21 May 2015

Supernovae
20150503
Coma Berenices